Amsterdamsche Football Club Ajax eSports, commonly known as Ajax eSports, or simply Ajax, is a Dutch professional esports club founded in 2016, and based in the city of Amsterdam in the Netherlands. The club is the esports department of Ajax.

History

On September 22, 2016, Ajax launched Ajax eSports. The club acquired Koen Weijland, five-time national champion of the Netherlands, and FIFA World Champion in 2010, 2011 and 2015. He was officially given the number 39 shirt, with his arrival being announced just weeks ahead of the 'FIFA 17 XPERIENCE' on the Kalverstraat in Amsterdam. Ajax eSports also announced its participation to FIFA video gaming competitions.

Roster

FIFA

Management

External links

Official websites
Ajax eSports: HOME

References

eSports
2016 establishments in the Netherlands
Esports teams based in the Netherlands
FIFA (video game series) teams